María Del Mar Olmedo Justicia (born August 10, 1983, in  Almería) is a judo athlete from Spain. She has a disability: she is blind and a B3 type athlete. She competed in judo at the 2004 Summer Paralympics.  She was the number two judo athlete in the women's + 70 Kilogram group.

References 

Spanish female judoka
Living people
1983 births
Paralympic silver medalists for Spain
Judoka at the 2004 Summer Paralympics
Paralympic medalists in judo
Sportspeople from Almería
Paralympic judoka of Spain
Medalists at the 2004 Summer Paralympics